The 1984–85 Calgary Flames season was the fifth season in Calgary and 13th for the Flames franchise in the National Hockey League.  It was a breakout season for the Flames, as they tied a franchise record for wins with 41, and set new team marks for points, 95, and goals for, 363.  Despite the improvement, the Flames managed only a third-place finish in the Smythe Division.  In the playoffs, the Flames met the second place Winnipeg Jets, where they fell three games to one.

Following the playoff disappointment, General Manager Cliff Fletcher began a series of moves to remake the team that included shipping out top scorer Kent Nilsson in a deal for a pair of second round draft picks that would eventually become Joe Nieuwendyk and Stephane Matteau.<ref>Kent Nilsson profile @ legendsofhockey.net</ref>

Calgary hosted the 1985 All-Star Game at the Olympic Saddledome, a 6–4 victory by the Wales Conference over the Campbell Conference.  The Flames were represented at the game by Al MacInnis and Paul Reinhart.

Regular season

Season standings

Schedule and results

Playoffs

Player statistics

SkatersNote: GP = Games played; G = Goals; A = Assists; Pts = Points; PIM = Penalty minutes†Denotes player spent time with another team before joining Calgary.  Stats reflect time with the Flames only.
‡Traded mid-season.

GoaltendersNote: GP = Games played; TOI = Time on ice (minutes); W = Wins; L = Losses; OT = Overtime/shootout losses; GA = Goals against; SO = Shutouts; GAA = Goals against averageTransactions
The Flames were involved in the following transactions during the 1984–85 season.

Trades

Free agents

Draft picks

Calgary's picks at the 1984 NHL Entry Draft, held in Montreal, Quebec.

See also
1984–85 NHL season

References

Player stats: 2006–07 Calgary Flames Media Guide, p. 127.
Game log: 2006–07 Calgary Flames Media Guide'', p. 140.
Team standings:  1984–85 NHL standings @hockeydb.com
Trades: Individual player pages at hockeydb.com

Calgary Flames seasons
Calgary Flames season, 1984-85
National Hockey League All-Star Game hosts
Calg
Calgary Flames
Calgary Flames